Catherine Lucy Innes (c.1840 – 28 April 1900) was a New Zealand writer. She was born in London, England in c.1840.

References

1840s births
1900 deaths
English emigrants to New Zealand
19th-century New Zealand writers
19th-century New Zealand women writers